Heinrich Joseph Esser (15 July 1818 – 3 June 1872) was a German violinist, influential conductor and composer.

Biography 
Heinrich Esser was born in Mannheim. He got musical instruction by Franz Lachner who was court conductor in Mannheim from 1834. Esser followed Lachner to Munich in 1836 and went to Vienna in 1839 in order to complete his studies under Simon Sechter.

In 1840, he had a position as court conductor at the National Theatre Mannheim, but left for his new appointment as a conductor of the singing society in Mainz during the following year. During his time in Mainz, Esser was teacher in music composition of Peter Cornelius. In 1847, Esser became conductor at the Vienna Court Opera which he directed temporarily in 1860/1861. He also became an honorary member of the Vienna Men's Choral Association in 1859 and conducted concerts of the Vienna Philharmonic. In the course of his activities as a consultant for the publisher Franz Schott, Esser got in contact with Richard Wagner in 1859, whose musical works he strongly supported. (He directed the Viennese first performance of Lohengrin in 1858).

In late 1869, Esser retired and moved to Salzburg where he died of tuberculosis in 1872.

Works 
Esser composed operas, five symphonies, two suites for orchestra and a large number of lieder that were largely known at their time. His two best known operas are Thomas Riquiqui oder die politische Heirath (op. 10, Text by Carl Gollmick, first performance in Frankfurt am Main, 1843) and Die zwei Prinzen (op. 15, Text by Carl Gollmick, first performance in Munich, 1845). Furthermore, his Fourth Symphony (in d-minor op. 44, 1853) and Second Suite (in a-minor op.75, 1866)

External links

Sources 

Woess, Margareta (1947), Heinrich Esser. Eine Darstellung seines Lebens und Wirkens als Dirigent unter besonderer Berücksichtigung seiner Beziehung zu Richard Wagner. Dissertation University of Vienna, 3 vols.

Mueller, Karl-Josef (1969), Heinrich Esser als Komponist. Dissertation University of Mainz.
"Heinrich Esser" at Austrian Music Encyclopedia Online.

German violinists
German conductors (music)
German male conductors (music)
Musicians from Mannheim
1818 births
1872 deaths
19th-century German composers
19th-century conductors (music)
19th-century violinists
German male violinists